Home is a novel written by the Pulitzer Prize-winning American author Marilynne Robinson. Published in 2008, it is Robinson's third novel, preceded by Housekeeping in 1980 and Gilead in 2004.

The novel chronicles the life of the Boughton family, specifically the father, Reverend Robert Boughton, and Glory and Jack, two of Robert's adult children who return home to Gilead, Iowa. A companion to Gilead, Home is an independent novel that takes place concurrently and examines some of the same events from a different angle.

The novel won one of the 2008 Los Angeles Times Book Prizes, the 2009 Orange Prize for Fiction and was a finalist for the 2008 National Book Award for Fiction.

Home was named one of the "100 Notable Books of 2008" by The New York Times, one of the "Best Books of 2008" by The Washington Post, one of the "Favorite Books 2008" of The Los Angeles Times, one of the "Best Books of 2008" of The San Francisco Chronicle, as well as one of The New Yorker book critic James Wood's ten favorite books of 2008.

References

External links
Novel's description at its publisher's website
Review of Home in The New Yorker by James Wood, September 8, 2008
Review of Home in The New York Times by A. O. Scott, September 19, 2008
Review of Home in The Washington Post by Ron Charles, September 7, 2008
Review of Home in The Los Angeles Times by Emily Barton, September 7, 2008
Review of Home in Christianity Today by Linda McCullough Moore, September 8, 2008
Review of Home in The San Francisco Chronicle by Joan Frank, September 14, 2008
Interview with Marilynne Robinson about her novels, interviewed by Sarah Fay in The Paris Review, Fall 2008
Marilynne Robinson reads from Home, Free Library of Philadelphia, September 29, 2008

2008 American novels
Women's Prize for Fiction-winning works
Novels set in Iowa
Farrar, Straus and Giroux books
Novels by Marilynne Robinson
Third-person narrative novels